Media Trust is a privately held Nigerian newspaper publishing company based in Abuja that publishes the English-language Daily Trust, Weekly Trust, Sunday Trust and the Hausa-language Aminiya newspapers, as well as a new pan-African magazine, Kilimanjaro. It is one of the leading media companies in Nigeria.

History
The Weekly Trust was established in March 1998 and the Daily Trust was launched in January 2001. The two papers are the largest circulating newspapers in Northern Nigeria.
The group of newspapers ranks among the top seven in Nigeria in advertising revenue.

Content
The newspapers have online editions and content from the newspapers is republished by AllAfrica and Gamji.
The company presents the "Daily Trust African of the Year" award, recognizing and celebrating Africans who have made positive contributions that affect the lives of other people and have attracted pan-African attention during the award year.

Controversies 
Daily Trust has been involved in really controversial reportage that has made a lot of people tag the newspaper as sensational.

Personnel
The chairman of the board and chief executive officer is Kabiru Abdullahi Yusuf. He was a Senior Lecturer of the Department of Political Science, Usman Dan Fodio University, Sokoto, and has worked as a columnist and commentator for companies that include the Daily Triumph, Citizen Magazine, Newswatch and BBC Africa Service.
Jaafar Jaafar the Editor in Chief of Daily Nigerian was one of their staff between 2007 and 2011.

References

External links
 Official Website

1998 establishments in Nigeria
Newspapers established in 1998
Mass media in Abuja